Francis Butler Loomis (July 27, 1861 – August 4, 1948) served as the United States Ambassador to Venezuela from 1897 to 1901 and the United States Ambassador to Portugal from 1901 to 1902. He was the United States Assistant Secretary of State from 1903 to 1905 when he was appointed as the acting United States Secretary of State. His son was Major general Francis B. Loomis Jr.

Biography
He was born on July 27, 1861.

He began his career as a newspaperman in his hometown of Marietta, Ohio, editing the Marietta Leader while a student at Marietta College. A year following his graduation in 1883, Loomis became a reporter for the New York Tribune and later assumed a campaign press relations position. He returned to Ohio to serve as state librarian for two years (from 1885 to 1887).

It was during the administration of President Benjamin Harrison that Loomis first entered government service as consul at Saint-Étienne, and at Grenoble, France, until 1893. For the next three years from 1893 to 1896, Loomis returned briefly to journalism as editor of the Cincinnati Daily Tribune. President William McKinley appointed him Ambassador to Venezuela in 1897 and to Portugal in 1901.

A year later, he was recalled to Washington, DC, and was appointed Assistant Secretary of State. On the death of Secretary John Hay, he served as acting Secretary of State briefly in 1905. During his State Department tenure, he became associated with the reorganization of the American Red Cross, serving as a charter member. His commissions included final negotiations which resulted in the acquisition of the Panama Canal Zone, service as special ambassador to France to receive the body of John Paul Jones and Special Envoy Extraordinary to Japan, arranging the visit of the U.S. fleet to that country in 1908. Shortly before World War I Loomis returned to private business as foreign trade adviser to the Standard Oil Company serving until retirement.

He died on August 4, 1948, in the San Francisco Bay area in California.

External links

Biography at Marietta College
Guide to the Francis Butler Loomis Papers: microfilm, 1897–1939

1861 births
1948 deaths
19th-century American diplomats
20th-century American diplomats
Politicians from Marietta, Ohio
United States Assistant Secretaries of State
Ambassadors of the United States to Venezuela
American newspaper editors
American male journalists
American newspaper reporters and correspondents
New-York Tribune personnel
Ambassadors of the United States to Portugal
Journalists from Ohio
Acting United States Secretaries of State